Ricardo Alexandre Campos Costa (born 10 January 1973) is a Portuguese footballer who played in the Segunda Divisão de Honra for Maia and Campomaiorense, in the lower divisions for a large number of clubs, mainly in the Castelo Branco district, and in the English Football League Third Division for Darlington.

Notes

References

1973 births
Living people
Sportspeople from Barreiro, Portugal
Portuguese footballers
Association football midfielders
C.F. Estrela da Amadora players
Vitória F.C. players
Sport Benfica e Castelo Branco players
S.C. Campomaiorense players
C.F. União de Coimbra players
F.C. Maia players
C.D. Trofense players
Darlington F.C. players
S.C. Vila Real players
FC Pampilhosa players
Sertanense F.C. players
A.R.C. Oleiros players
Segunda Divisão players
Liga Portugal 2 players
English Football League players
Expatriate footballers in England
Portuguese expatriate sportspeople in England